Perigonia leucopus is a moth of the  family Sphingidae. It is known from Brazil.

The forewing upperside similar to Perigonia stulta, but the base and postmedian area are shaded with grey and there is a conspicuous lunate patch on the outer margin. There is a brown marginal band on the hindwing upperside. There is a tornal patch that is paler than the rest of the wing on the hindwing underside.

References

Perigonia
Moths described in 1910